Carlsson is a Swedish patronymic surname meaning "son of Carl" or "Carl’s son". Cognates include Carlson and Karlsson. The parallel Danish-Norwegian forms are Karlsen and Carlsen.

Notable people with the surname include:

Agnes Carlsson, 2005 Idol winner
Albertina Carlsson (1848-1930) Swedish zoologist.
Allan Carlsson (boxer), Swedish boxer
Allan Carlsson (cyclist) (1929 – 1953), Swedish cyclist
Andreas Carlsson, Swedish music producer, composer, and pop songwriter
Arvid Carlsson, famous neuroscientist
Bernt Carlsson (1938–1988), Swedish politician, United Nations Commissioner for Namibia
Christoffer Carlsson (born 1989), Swedish football player
Clas-Göran Carlsson (born 1962), Swedish politician
Erik Carlsson (1929–2015), Swedish rally driver
Gabriel Carlsson (born 1997), Swedish ice hockey player
Göran Carlsson (born 1963), Swedish curler
Gunilla Carlsson (born 1963), Swedish politician
Henry Carlsson, Swedish footballer
Ingvar Carlsson (born 1934), Swedish politician, Prime Minister of Sweden (1986 – 1991; 1994 – 1996)
Janne Carlsson, Swedish film and television actor
Johan Carlsson (footballer) 
Johan Carlsson (tennis), former professional tennis player
Kent Carlsson, former tennis player
Leo Carlsson (born 2004), Swedish ice hockey player 
Magnus Carlsson (disambiguation), multiple people
Márcio Carlsson, former professional tennis player
Maria Carlsson (born 1937), German translator
Nicklas Carlsson, professional footballer 
Pat Moss-Carlsson (1934–2008), English rally driver
Peter Carlsson, former professional tennis player
Pontus Carlsson (born 1982), Swedish chess grandmaster
Robin Carlsson (Robyn) (born 1979), Swedish musician
Rose-Marie Carlsson (born 1954), Swedish politician
Sven Carlsson (1915–1995), Swedish curler
Tobias Carlsson, retired Swedish footballer

See also
Carlsson (car company), German car tuning manufacturer
Carlsen (disambiguation)
Carlson (disambiguation)
 Carlston (name)
Karlson (disambiguation)
Karlsson (disambiguation)

Swedish-language surnames
Patronymic surnames
Surnames from given names